The Bourbon Legend is Jason Boland & The Stragglers's fifth album. It was released in the fall of 2006. The song "Rattlesnakes" is a cover, co-written with Bob Childers.  It was produced by longtime Dwight Yoakam collaborator Pete Anderson.

Track listing
"Last Country Song" (Jason Boland, Pete Anderson) - 3:40
"The Bourbon Legend" (Boland, Drew Kennedy, Anderson) - 3:19
"No One Left To Blame" (Boland, Anderson) - 4:02
"Jesus and Ruger" (Boland) - 3:27
"Up and Gone" (Boland, Anderson) - 4:40
"Baby That's Just Me" (Boland, Mike McClure) - 4:11
"Can't Tell If I Drink" (Boland, Peter Dawson) - 3:29
"Lonely By Choice" (Roger Ray) - 2:59
"Rattlesnakes" (Bob Childers, Boland) - 3:38
"Time In Hell" (Boland, Anderson) - 4:06
"Everyday Life" (Boland) - 5:22

Personnel
Jason Boland - Vocals, Acoustic Guitar  
Roger Ray - Electric Guitar, Pedal Steel, Lap Steel
Brad Rice - Drums
Grant Tracy - Bass Guitar
Noah Jeffries - Fiddle, Mandolin
Pete Anderson - Electric Guitar, Acoustic Guitar, Bass Guitar, Mandolin, Dobro, Banjo, Percussion
Bob "Boo" Bernstein - Pedal Steel
Donny Reed - Fiddle
Anthony Crawford - Background Vocals
Tommy Funderburk - Background Vocals
Michael Murphy - Keyboards

Chart performance

Jason Boland & The Stragglers albums
2006 albums
Albums produced by Pete Anderson